Salimabad (also Romanized as Salīmābād) is a village in Goli Jan Rural District, in the Central District of Tonekabon County, Mazandaran Province, Iran. At the 2006 census, its population was 715, in 178 families.

References 

Populated places in Tonekabon County